Del Tongo was an Italian professional cycling team that was active between 1982 and 1991. The team disbanded, but provided the basis for Lampre.

History

The team was led primarily by two Italian sports directors: Pietro Algeri and Paolo Abetoni. They won the 1983 Giro d'Italia with Giuseppe Saronni. They only participated once in the Tour de France, in 1987. In 1992, the team stops but a new team, MG Maglificio was formed by Algeri and Abetoni along with Belgians Roger De Vlaeminck and Patrick Lefevere.

Notable riders

 Giuseppe Saronni 
 Guido Van Calster 
 Dietrich Thurau 
 Rolf Gölz 
 Gianbattista Baronchelli 
 Franco Chioccioli 
 Mario Cipollini 
 Maurizio Fondriest 
 Franco Ballerini 
 Fabio Baldato

Major wins

Major One-Day Races
Giro di Lombardia
1982 Giuseppe Saronni 
1986 Gianbattista Baronchelli 
Milan–San Remo
1983 Giuseppe Saronni 
Grand Prix des Amériques
1990 Franco Ballerini

Grand Tours

Giro d'Italia
General classification (1983) – Giuseppe Saronni 
General classification (1991) – Franco Chioccioli 
14 stages (3 in 1982, 3 in 1983, 1 in 1984, 1 in 1985, 1 in 1989, 2 in 1990 and 3 in 1991)

Vuelta a España
4 stages (2 in 1983, 2 in 1984)

Other races

2 stages in the Tour of Germany (2 in 1982)
General classification Tour de Suisse (1982)
3 stages in the Tour de Suisse (3 in 1982)
General classification Tirreno–Adriatico (1982)
4 stages in the Tirreno–Adriatico (2 in 1982, 2 in 1987)
1 stage in the Tour de Romandie (in 1987)
1 stage in the Volta a Catalunya (in 1988)

References

Defunct cycling teams based in Italy
Cycling teams established in 1982
Cycling teams disestablished in 1991
Cycling teams based in Italy
1982 establishments in Italy